Richard James Warren (12 March 1869 – 5 August 1940) was a member of the Queensland Legislative Assembly.

He was born at Barkstead, a small town near Ballarat in Victoria, the son of Humphrey Warren and his wife Fanny (née Eldridge). He was a wheat farmer and pastoralist in New South Wales and Chinchilla in Queensland. In 1915 he was with the 26th Battalion of the First Australian Imperial Force and was discharged due to sickness during the Gallipoli Campaign.

Warren married  Louisa Jeffery in 1898 in Sydney. Louisa died in 1927 and the next year he married Maude Ellen Parry in Brisbane. Warren died in Brisbane in 1940 and was buried in the Toowong Cemetery.

Public career
Warren, at first representing the National Party,  won the seat of Murrumba at the 1918 Queensland state election, easily defeating the Labor candidate. He also represented the Country Party, United Party, and finally the Country and Progressive National Party during his time in the parliament. He went on to be the member for Murrumba until his retirement from politics at the 1932 state election.

References

Members of the Queensland Legislative Assembly
1869 births
1940 deaths
Burials at Toowong Cemetery
National Party of Australia members of the Parliament of Queensland